Häädemeeste (Estonian for "Good Men") is a small borough in Pärnu County, southwestern Estonia. It is the administrative centre of Häädemeeste Parish. Häädemeeste has a population of 790 (as of 1 January 2010).

Gallery

References

External links
Häädemeeste Parish 

Boroughs and small boroughs in Estonia
Kreis Pernau